Odice is a genus of moths of the family Erebidae. The genus was erected by Jacob Hübner in 1823.

Taxonomy
The genus has previously been classified in the subfamily Eublemminae of Erebidae or the subfamily Eustrotiinae of the family Noctuidae.

Species
 Odice arcuinna Hübner, 1790
 Odice blandula Rambur, 1858
 Odice jucunda Hübner, [1813] – delightful marbled moth
 Odice pergrata Rambur, 1858
 Odice suava Hübner, [1813]

References

Boletobiinae
Noctuoidea genera